Flushing Avenue may refer to:

 Flushing Avenue, a street running through northern Brooklyn and west central Queens

New York City Subway stations
Flushing Avenue (BMT Jamaica Line), serving the  trains
Flushing Avenue (IND Crosstown Line), serving the  train